The St Kilda Soccer Club is an Australian semi-professional association football (soccer) club based in the Melbourne suburb of Elwood. The club was founded in 2011 by the local Irish Australian community, that fields senior and junior teams for men and women operating under license from Football Victoria. The club has no connection to either of the two previous clubs of the same name that competed in 1909–1934 and 1984–1991 respectively.

Honours

League
 Fourth Division
Winners (1): 2016
 Fifth Division
 Winners (2): 2015, 2022
 Sixth Division
 Winners (2): 2013, 2014
 Eighth Division
 Winners (1): 2012
Source:

References

External links
 

Soccer clubs in Melbourne
Association football clubs established in 2011
2011 establishments in Australia
Victorian State League teams
Soccer Club
Irish-Australian culture
Sport in the City of Port Phillip